Make Up is a 1927 German silent film directed by Felix Basch and starring Marcella Albani, Sandra Milovanoff, and Werner Krauss.

The film's art direction was by Alfred Junge and Gustav A. Knauer.

Cast

External links

1927 films
Films of the Weimar Republic
Films directed by Felix Basch
German silent feature films
German black-and-white films
1920s German-language films